The Royal Air Force Air Cadets (RAFAC) is a volunteer-military youth organisation sponsored by the Royal Air Force that manages both the Air Training Corps and RAF Sections of the Combined Cadet Force. The organisation is headed by a former serving RAF officer, Commandant Air Cadets. The current commandant is Air Commodore Tony Keeling.

Prior to 1 October 2017, the RAFAC was called the Air Cadet Organisation (ACO). As of 1 April 2014, the ACO had a strength of 53,360 cadets and cadet force adult volunteers. Cadets are aged between 12 and 17 on entry to the organisation, and can remain until they are 18, or with special permission, until they are 20. 

The RAFAC is made up of:
 Headquarters Air Cadets at RAF Cranwell
 6 Regional Headquarters
 34 Wing Headquarters
 Two National Air Cadet Adventure Training Centres
 Over 900 Air Training Corps Squadrons in the UK and overseas
 Around 200 RAF contingents of the Combined Cadet Force

See also
Royal Air Force Volunteer Reserve (Training Branch)
Air Experience Flight
Volunteer Gliding Squadrons
Air Defence Cadet Corps (1938–41)
Royal Air Force boy entrants

References

External links 
 

Royal Air Force
 
 
 
British Cadet organisations
Youth organisations based in the United Kingdom
Organisations based in Lincolnshire
Youth organizations established in 1941